First Presbyterian Church is a historic church at 234 E. Main Street in Rock Hill, South Carolina.

It was designed by Charles Coker Wilson and was built in 1894.  It was added to the National Register in 1992.

References

Presbyterian churches in South Carolina
Churches on the National Register of Historic Places in South Carolina
Churches completed in 1894
19th-century Presbyterian church buildings in the United States
National Register of Historic Places in Rock Hill, South Carolina
Buildings and structures in Rock Hill, South Carolina
Churches in York County, South Carolina